Ashdot Ya'akov Ihud is a kibbutz in northern Israel. Located to the south of the Sea of Galilee near the Jordanian border and covering 4,200 dunams, it falls under the jurisdiction of Emek HaYarden Regional Council.

History
The kibbutz was established in 1953 by members of Ihud HaKvutzot VeHaKibbutzim as a result of a split in the original kibbutz of Ashdot Ya'akov (members of HaKibbutz HaMeuhad established Ashdot Ya'akov Meuhad).

References

Kibbutzim
Kibbutz Movement
Populated places established in 1953
Populated places in Northern District (Israel)